The river Ternoise is one of the small chalk streams that flow from the plateau of the southern Boulonnais and Picardy, via the Canche, into the English Channel. It is one of the rivers of the Seven Valleys tourist area and gives its name to the Ternois area.

Geography

Towns and villages along the course
The Ternoise flows through the following places (all within the Pas-de-Calais department):
Ligny-Saint-Flochel, Roëllecourt, Saint-Michel-sur-Ternoise, Saint-Pol-sur-Ternoise, Gauchin-Verloingt, Hernicourt, Wavrans-sur-Ternoise, Monchy-Cayeux, Anvin, Teneur, Érin, Tilly-Capelle, Blangy-sur-Ternoise, Blingel, Rollancourt, Auchy-lès-Hesdin, Le Parcq, Grigny and Huby-Saint-Leu.

Tributaries
The Faux and the Eps are the only principal watercourses joining the Ternoise.

Hydrological Information
The Ternoise is a very uniform river. Seasonal flow fluctuations are not very marked, similar to the Canche or the Somme, its neighbours. The higher water flows occur at the end of winter and in the spring. Average flows vary between 3.44 m³ per second in September to 5.36 m³ per second in March.

Gallery

See also
Schéma directeur d'aménagement et de gestion des eaux

References

External links

Carte Géologique de la France à l'échelle du millionième 6th edn. BRGM (2003) 
Banque Hydro - Station E5406510 - La Ternoise à Hesdin (option Synthèse)  
Carte des bassins versants de la Canche et de la Ternoise
 Informations sur les atlas des zones inondables

Rivers of France
Rivers of the Pas-de-Calais
Rivers of Hauts-de-France